The Hermann 19 is an American trailerable sailboat that was designed by Richard P. Ketcham Jr. as a daysailer and pocket cruiser and first built in 1963.

Production
The design was built by Ted Hermann's Boat Shop in Seaford, New York, United States from 1963 until about 1967, but it is now out of production. The company went out of business in about 1978.

Design
The Hermann 19 is a recreational keelboat, built predominantly of fiberglass, with wood trim. It has a fractional sloop rig, a raked stem, an angled transom, a transom-hung rudder controlled by a tiller and a fixed keel and centerboard, or, optionally, centerboard only. It displaces  and carries  of ballast.

The boat is normally fitted with a small  outboard motor for docking and maneuvering.

Operational history
In a 2010 review Steve Henkel wrote, "best features: Compared with other boats of her approximate size, weight, and draft, the Hermann 19 has less ballast but more weight in the fiberglass, perhaps making her skin tougher (which is true of other Ted Hermann Boat Shop productions, like the Hermann Cat 17), Very shallow draft with centerboard up, as with her comp[etitor]s, makes her suitable for exploring shoal waters. Worst features: Headroom is relatively low—though a small collapsible dodger in the companionway, as shown in the sailplan, may give some relief to those crouching below."

See also
List of sailing boat types

Related development
Hermann 22

References

Keelboats
1960s sailboat type designs
Sailing yachts
Trailer sailers
Sailboat type designs by Richard P. Ketcham Jr.
Sailboat types built by Ted Hermann's Boat Shop